Kentucky elected its members August 5, 1816.

See also 
 Kentucky's 1st congressional district special election, 1816
 United States House of Representatives elections, 1816 and 1817
 List of United States representatives from Kentucky

Notes 

1816
Kentucky
United States House of Representatives